Herpetopoma pruinosum is a species of sea snail, a marine gastropod mollusk in the family Chilodontidae.

Distribution
This marine species occurs off the Kermadec Islands, New Zealand.

References

 Marshall B. A. (1979). The Trochidae and Turbinidae of the Kermadec Ridge (Mollusca: Gastropoda). New Zealand Journal of Zoology 6: 521-552 page(s): 525

External links
 To Encyclopedia of Life
 To World Register of Marine Species

pruinosum
Gastropods described in 1979